Yaroslav Solonynko (born April 2, 1991) is a Ukrainian footballer who plays with Toronto Falcons in the Canadian Soccer League.

Career

Europe 
Solonynko began his career in 2008 with FC Dynamo Khmelnytskyi in the Ukrainian Second League. Throughout his tenure with Dynamo, he played in 20 matches for two seasons. In 2010, he signed a contract with FC Obolon-Brovar Kyiv of the Ukrainian Premier League. After failing to break into the first team with Kyiv he returned to his former club Dynamo on a loan deal in 2011. 

He remained in the Second League by signing with league rivals FC Hirnyk-Sport Horishni Plavni in 2012. He played in the Russian Professional Football League with FC Zhemchuzhina Yalta the following season. In 2014, he played abroad to play in Poland's IV liga with Rol.Ko Konojady. In 2016, he returned to Ukraine to sign with FC Ternopil in the Ukrainian First League. In his debut season with Ternopil, he played in 16 matches.

Canada 
After the relegation of Ternopil, he went overseas to play in the Canadian Soccer League with FC Vorkuta. Throughout the season he assisted in securing the First Division title. In his second season with Vorkuta, he assisted in securing the CSL Championship. In 2020, he assisted in securing Vorkuta's second championship title after defeating Scarborough SC.

In 2021, he assisted in securing Vorkuta's third regular-season title and secured the ProSound Cup against Scarborough. He also played in the 2021 playoffs where Vorkuta was defeated by Scarborough in the championship final. After five seasons with Vorkuta he signed with expansion franchise Toronto Falcons.

Honors 
FC Vorkuta

 CSL Championship: 2018, 2020
 Canadian Soccer League First Division/Regular Season: 2017, 2019, 2021 
ProSound Cup: 2021

References 

1991 births
Living people
Sportspeople from Khmelnytskyi, Ukraine
Ukrainian footballers
FC Dynamo Khmelnytskyi players
FC Hirnyk-Sport Horishni Plavni players
FC Zhemchuzhyna Yalta players
FC Ternopil players
FC Continentals players
Canadian Soccer League (1998–present) players
Association football midfielders
Ukrainian First League players
Ukrainian expatriate footballers
Ukrainian expatriate sportspeople in Canada
Expatriate soccer players in Canada
Ukrainian Second League players
IV liga players